Johneshwy Ali Fargas (born December 15, 1994) is a Puerto Rican professional baseball outfielder who is currently a free agent. He has played in Major League Baseball (MLB) for the New York Mets and Chicago Cubs. Fargas was drafted by the San Francisco Giants in the 11th round of the 2013 Major League Baseball draft.

Professional career

San Francisco Giants
Fargas was drafted by the San Francisco Giants in the 11th round of the 2013 MLB draft. He made his professional debut with the AZL Giants. In 2014, he played for the Low-A Salem-Keizer Volcanoes, slashing .240/.373/.329 with 3 home runs and 13 RBI. He played for the Single-A Augusta GreenJackets, in 2015, hitting .278/.347/.349 with 2 home runs and 35 RBI in 102 games. He split 2016 between the High-A San Jose Giants and Augusta, accumulating a .242/.313/.311 in 119 games between the two teams. The next year, Fargas again played for San Jose and Augusta, slashing .200/.256/.314. He played the 2018 season in San Jose, batting .288/.354/.421 and leading the California League with 47 stolen bases. In 2019, Fargas played for the Double-A Richmond Flying Squirrels, hitting .249/.325/.334 and leading the Eastern League with 50 stolen bases in 127 games. On November 4, 2019, he elected free agency.

New York Mets
On January 9, 2020, Fargas signed a minor league contract with the New York Mets organization that included an invitation to spring training. During a spring training game against the St. Louis Cardinals, Fargas hit for the cycle. Fargas did not play in a game in 2020 due to the cancellation of the minor league season because of the COVID-19 pandemic. He was added to the Mets’ 60-man player pool for the abbreviated season, but spent the year at the alternate training site.

Fargas re-signed with the Mets on a new minor league deal on November 4, 2020. On May 17, 2021, Fargas was selected to the 40-man roster and promoted to the major leagues for the first time following injuries to outfielders Brandon Nimmo, Albert Almora and Michael Conforto. He made his MLB debut that day as the starting center fielder against the Atlanta Braves. In the game, Fargas recorded his first career hit, an RBI double off of Braves pitcher Sean Newcomb. He started each of the team's following six games before running into the outfield wall at Citi Field and suffering a shoulder sprain on May 24. On July 19, Fargas was designated for assignment by the Mets. In 7 games, he had gone 6-for-21 (.286) with 3 RBI.

Chicago Cubs
On July 23, 2021, Fargas was claimed off of waivers by the Chicago Cubs. He was then assigned to the Triple-A Iowa Cubs.
On July 31, Fargas was recalled by the Cubs.
In 13 games for the Cubs, Fargas hit .269 with 0 home runs and 2 RBI's. On August 18, he was designated for assignment by the Cubs. On August 20, Fargas cleared waivers and was assigned outright to Triple-A Iowa. At the very end of the Cubs' season he was added to the team's roster as a COVID-19 replacement and was removed on October 18, 2021.

New York Mets (second stint)
On March 5, 2022, Fargas signed a minor league contract to return to the New York Mets. On August 15, 2022, Fargas was released by the Mets.

References

External links

1994 births
Living people
Major League Baseball players from Puerto Rico
Major League Baseball outfielders
New York Mets players
Chicago Cubs players
Arizona League Giants players
Salem-Keizer Volcanoes players
Augusta GreenJackets players
San Jose Giants players
Richmond Flying Squirrels players
Syracuse Mets players
Gigantes de Carolina players
Criollos de Caguas players
Florida Complex League Mets players
Binghamton Rumble Ponies players
Iowa Cubs players
People from Trujillo Alto, Puerto Rico
2023 World Baseball Classic players